Saint-Paul-de-Varax is a commune in the Ain department in eastern France.

It is situated between Bourg-en-Bresse and Lyon. Its castle, which belonged to the Rivérieulx de Varax family since the 13th century, is closed to the public.

Population

See also
 Dombes
Communes of the Ain department

References

External links

Dombes and Saint-Paul-de-Varax

Communes of Ain
Ain communes articles needing translation from French Wikipedia